Raphael Almeida-Knüttgen (born 7 January 1991) is a Brazilian footballer who plays as a forward.

Career
Almeida-Knüttgen made his professional debut for VfR Aalen in the 3. Liga on 9 April 2011, coming on as a substitute in the 70th minute for Marco Grüttner in the 0–0 home draw against SV Sandhausen.

References

External links
 Profile at DFB.de
 Profile at kicker.de
 TSV Essingen statistics at Fussball.de
 SV Waldhausen statistics at Fussball.de
 SV Lauchheim statistics at Fussball.de
 

1991 births
Living people
Sportspeople from Minas Gerais
Brazilian footballers
German footballers
Brazilian people of German descent
Association football forwards
VfR Aalen players
3. Liga players
Regionalliga players